The 3P+S Input/Output Module was an S-100 expansion card introduced to the microcomputer market by Processor Technology. It supplied three parallel ports and one serial port, the latter of which conformed to the RS-232C standard. One of the three parallel ports was dedicated to interfacing with the host computer over the S-100 bus, while the other two were available for general use.

An Altair 8800 equipped with a 3P+S could use one of the parallel ports to accept input from a keyboard and another to output to a TV Typewriter, allowing the user to construct an all-in-one machine that did not need an external computer terminal to work. This also left the serial port free, which could be used to drive a teletype machine as a computer printer, or a punch tape system for storage.

Processor Technology later combined the 3P+S with the VDM-1 graphics card in a compact S-100 machine of their own to produce the Sol-20, the first all-in-one mass-produced personal computer.

References 
 
 

S-100 machines